King of the Gil is the debut album of Enrique Gil under Star Music, released in July 2013.

The album was co-produced by Thyro and hip hop artist Paw Chavez. It contains seven tracks; "Oha (Kaya Mo Ba To?)" [lit. "Can You Do This?"], "Rockin’ Them Jeans" featuring Tippy Dos Santos, "Miss Miss", "Ikaw Lamang" [lit. "Only You"], "So Fly" and two medleys of songs originally by Hagibis and VST & Co.

The track "Ikaw Lamang" was included as one of the theme songs for the 2013 film She's the One.

Track listing

Awards and recognition
 Nominated for Dance Album of the Year at 6TH PMPC STAR AWARDS FOR MUSIC

References

Star Music albums
Enrique Gil albums
2013 debut albums